Synctool is an open-source configuration management system, written by Walter de Jong, systems expert at SURFsara. Synctool aims to be easy to understand, learn and use. It is built in Python and makes use of SSH (with host or key based authentication) and rsync. It has the following characteristics:
 A host can be part of logical groups. 
 Groups can be nested.
 Files are designated in groups by means of filename extension.
 The 'overlay' directory tree contains the files and directories that should be copied (or 'synced') to the target host.
 No specific language is needed; scripts can be added in any scripting language.
 Scripts can be linked to files to perform actions after a file update.
 The 'tasks' directory contains scripts that are not linked to specific files but to a host or host groups; these tasks can be used for software package management. Synctool by itself offers limited package management tools.

See also

Comparison of open-source configuration management software
Infrastructure as code (IaC)
Infrastructure as Code Tools

References

Configuration management
System administration
Free network management software
Multi-agent network management software